Bio2Watt Malmesbury Thermal Power Station is a  biogas-fired thermal power plant under development in South Africa. Bio2Watt, a South African company, entirely owned by Black women, has signed a power purchase agreement (PPA) to supply 4.8 megawatts of electricity to South African Breweries (SAB) for use in their brewery near Cape Town. As raw material, the power station is designed to start with animal manure and urine, produced by 7,000 head of cattle at Morester's Vyvlei Dairy Farm. These will be supplemented by other organic waste, collected from farms and businesses in the nearby town of Malmesbury. The raw material will be digested anaerobically to produce industrial-grade biogas. The biogas will then be ignited to produce heat. That heat will be used to turn electric generators and produce electricity.

Location
The power plant is under construction at Morester's Vyvlei Dairy Farm, near the town of Malmesbury, in Swartland Municipality, West Coast District, in South Africa's Western Cape Province.

Overview
There are 70,000 dairy cows at Morester's Vyvlei Dairy Farm. The milk that they produce is supplied directly to the South African food and beverages company, Clover Industries Limited. Bio2Watt, plans to collect the manure and urine produced by those 70,000 cows and supplement it with organic waste collected from the town of Malmesbury. All this waste will then be anaerobically digested in new bio-digesters installed at the dairy farm.

The biogas will then be ignited to produce heat. The heat will be used to turn gas generators and produce electricity. In March 2022 Bio2Watt signed a long-term power purchase agreement (PPA), to supply 4.8 megawatts of electricity to the SAB brewery near Cape Town.

Ownership
The power station is owned and under development by Bio2Watt, a South African business entirely owned by Black women. Bio2Watt has established an ad hoc company  Cape Dairy Project (Pty) Limited (CDP), to develop, own, fund operate and maintain this renewable power project. CDP selected Anaergia, a Canadian company as the engineering, procurement and construction (EPC) contractor.

Funding
Funding sources for this waste-to-energy project include the entities listed in the table below:

Other considerations
This plant is the second waste-to-energy plant that is operated by Bio2Watt in South Africa.

See also

 List of power stations in South Africa
 Divo Biomass Power Station
 Sfax Waste To Methane Gas Project

References

External links
 Cape Dairy Biogas Plant (Pty) Limited
 Combigas: Bio2Watt, South Africa

Power stations in South Africa
Western Cape
Proposed power stations
Buildings and structures in South Africa
Economy of the Western Cape